The Battle of An was fought during the Spring and Autumn period in 589 BCE  at Hua Hill in the area of the present-day city of Jinan, Shandong between the states of Qi and Jin. It ended in a victory for the state of Jin and eventually resulted in an alliance between the two states.

Two of the three surviving commentaries on the Spring and Autumn Annals, the Zuo Zhuan and the Guliang Zhuan describe the event that led to
the battle as an insult that an emissary of Jin suffered at the court of Qi, but the two accounts differ on the nature of the insult. According to the
Zuo Zhuan, the duke of Qi allowed women to watch the emissary's visit from behind a screen, women who then insulted the emissary with their
laughter. The Guliang Zhuan claims that the duke of Qi insulted the emissaries of four visiting states by assigning each of them a server who shared their respective physical defects.

References

589 BC
An
6th century BC in China
An
Jin (Chinese state)
Qi (state)